Jackson Goldstone (born 2 February 2004) is a Canadian cyclist from Squamish, British Columbia competing in downhill mountain biking. He won the junior downhill 2021 UCI Mountain Bike World Championships in Val di Sole, Italy. And, the 2022 Junior World Cup overall title.

Reception
On September 11, 2022, Goldstone won the RedBull Hardline in Dyfi, Wales. Goldstone completed the revamped Hardline course in two minutes and twenty seconds, finishing  six and a half seconds clear of Joe Smith in second place. At 18 years old, Goldstone is the event’s youngest winner.

References

External links 
 

2004 births
Living people
People from Squamish, British Columbia
Canadian male cyclists
Canadian mountain bikers
Downhill mountain bikers
21st-century Canadian people